Thamer Jamal Mohammed Osman El Ziber (born 15 September 1990) is a Sudanese born-Qatari professional footballer who plays for Muaither as a left back.

On 21 May 2014, he joined Umm Salal on loan from El Jaish.

References

External links 
 
 

1990 births
Living people
Qatari footballers
Sudanese footballers
Sudanese expatriate footballers
Sudanese expatriate sportspeople in Qatar
Umm Salal SC players
El Jaish SC players
Al-Arabi SC (Qatar) players
Al-Gharafa SC players
Al-Khor SC players
Muaither SC players
Qatar Stars League players
Qatari Second Division players
Association football fullbacks
Sudanese emigrants to Qatar
Naturalised citizens of Qatar
Qatari people of Sudanese descent